Pavelló Girona-Fontajau is an indoor arena in Girona, Catalonia, northern Spain, that holds 5,500 people. It is primarily used for basketball and is the home arena of Uni Girona CB and Bàsquet Girona.

The building was designed in 1993 by the architects Esteve Bonell and Josep M. Gil and was opened on September 4th, 1993. It is structured in two levels, one for the public (the high level) and another, of which use is restricted to the sportsmen (the low level), with differentiated entries.

Apart from basketball, it is used also for other sports like Indoor motorcycle trials and tennis matches.

Notable events
Fontajau hosted the matches of three groups of the EuroBasket 1997 and the 2007 FIBA EuroCup Final Four, that local club Akasvayu Girona won.

In 2017, it hosted the Copa de la Reina de Baloncesto.

Attendances
This is a list of league attendances of CB Girona when it played in the Liga ACB.

References

External links
Pavelló Girona-Fontajau at Girona Town Hall website 

Girona
Indoor arenas in Spain
Girona
Girona
Buildings and structures in Girona
Sports venues completed in 1993
1993 establishments in Spain